Patrick  Gray (born 4 December 1872) was a Scottish professional footballer who played as a centre-half.

References

1872 births
People from Partick
Scottish footballers
Association football defenders
Yoker Athletic F.C. players
Partick Thistle F.C. players
Liverpool F.C. players
Grimsby Town F.C. players
Fulham F.C. players
Leyton F.C. players
Burton United F.C. players
Parkgate & Rawmarsh United F.C. players
English Football League players
Year of death missing